Rhizoplaca occulta is a species of crustose lichen in the  family Lecanoraceae.

References

Lecanoraceae
Lichen species
Lichens described in 2013
Taxa named by Helge Thorsten Lumbsch